Gilaneh (also Romanized as Gīlāneh) is a village in Kalan Rural District, Zarneh District, Eyvan County, Ilam Province, Iran. At the 2006 census, its population was 26, in 5 families. The village is populated by Kurds.

References 

Populated places in Eyvan County
Kurdish settlements in Ilam Province